Guerra de Empresas (April 2011) (Spanish for "War of the Promotions") was an annual professional wrestling major event and tournament produced by Mexican professional wrestling promotion International Wrestling Revolution Group (IWRG), which took place on April 24, 2011 in Arena Naucalpan, Naucalpan, State of Mexico, Mexico. IWRG's Guerra de Empresas series of events all center on inter-promotional competition with tag teams representing IWRG as well as a number of other wrestling promotions represented by one or more tag teams. The April tournament was the third tournament held by IWRG and the second held in 2011 by IWRG.

Production

Background
The Guerra de Empresas ("War of the Promotions") concept is a recurring tournament between representatives of various Mexican wrestling promotions hosted by different promotions over time, International Wrestling Revolution Group (IWRG; Sometimes referred to as Grupo Internacional Revolución in Spanish) hosted the first one in 2010 and has hosted one or more Guerra de Empresas each year since then, while also sending representatives to other promotions for their Guerra de Empresas shows. The Guerra de Empresas tournament was normally a single-elimination tag team tournament with eight teams fighting for the trophy. The IWRG Guerra de Empresas shows, as well as the majority of the IWRG shows in general, are held in "Arena Naucalpan", owned by the promoters of IWRG and their main arena. The January 2011 Guerra de Empresas show was the second IWRG promoted a show under that name.

Storylines
The event featured nine professional wrestling matches with different wrestlers involved in pre-existing scripted feuds, plots and storylines. Wrestlers were portrayed as either heels (referred to as rudos in Mexico, those that portray the "bad guys") or faces (técnicos in Mexico, the "good guy" characters) as they followed a series of tension-building events, which culminated in a wrestling match or series of matches. The Main Event was a 12-Man Steel Cage Match. The last two wrestlers who remained in the ring fought one on one in a Lucha de Apuestas Match ("Bet match"), wagering their mask on the outcome of the match. The event included wrestlers from International Wrestling Revolution Group (IWRG) as well as a number of Mexican freelance wrestlers. IWRG's Guerra de Empresas series of events all center on inter-promotional competition with tag teams representing IWRG as well as a number of other wrestling promotions represented by one or more tag teams.

Guerra de Empresas 2011 participants

Event
The event was originally slated to have Charly Manson team up with Cibernético in the sixth match of the night against Electroshock and La Parka but did not show up for the match. This forced IWRG to replace him with Halloween, turning the regular tag team match into a Parejas Increibles since Halloween was part of Los Perros del Mal, a rival of Cibernético. Halloween was originally slated to represent the Perros del Mal wrestling promotion in the Guerra de Empresas tournament, but was replaced by El Hijo de Pirata Morgan, an IWRG regular who did not work for Los Perros.

Results

Aftermath
It was later revealed that Charly Manson had missed the event as he and a friend were arrested after getting into a fight with two police officers on the day of the show. The fight resulted in one of the officers suffering a fractured skull, the other a broken nose and whiplash while Manson's friend was shot in the foot by a third officer. Manson (real name Jesús Pozos) was originally denied bail and was expected to be waiting for his trial in jail, facing a maximum sentence of 15 years in prison for charges of aggravated assault and attacking authority figures. On May 4, AAA announced that Pozos had been released on bail. Pozos' bail was revoked on June 30, after which he was arrested at a AAA taping and taken to a prison in Mexico City. On February 23, 2012, it was reported that Pozos had been sentenced to 15 years in prison for his role in the altercation with the two police officers.

References

External links 
IWRG official website

2011 in professional wrestling
2011 in Mexico
2011.04
April 2011 events in Mexico